Isidore I (? – February or March 1350) was the Ecumenical Patriarch of Constantinople from 1347 to 1350. Isidore Buchiras was a disciple of Gregory Palamas.

Early life

Isidore was an ethnic Greek born in Thessaloniki during the latter part of the 1290s where he became a teacher and spiritual guide.

Career
As a disciple of St. Gregory, he was drawn into the dispute between the followers of Gregory Palamas and Barlaam of Calabria over Hesychasm during the middle decades of the fourteenth century.

Synod of 1344
In 1345, Isidore, who was at the time the bishop elect of Monemvasia, and Gregory Palamas were excommunicated by a synod of anti-hesychast bishops that had been convened by Patriarch John XIV Kalekas who himself was an opponent of St. Gregory.

Palamas and Buchiras recanted.

Synods of 1347

In February 1347, during a synod convened by emperor John VI Kantakouzenos, Patr. John XIV was deposed and Isidore brought back and elected to succeed John XIV as patriarch of Constantinople. Upon becoming patriarch, Isidore released Gregory Palamas from prison and consecrated him Archbishop of Thessalonica.

Patriarchate
During the two and a half years of his patriarchate, Isidore sought to have the whole Byzantine Church accept the Palamite dogmas.  He selected bishops only from the Palamite party.  He instituted harsh penalties for those who refused to submit.

See also
Palamism
Hesychast controversy

References

3. Evangelos C. Pringipakis, "Patriarch Isidore I Boucheiras (± 1290 - 1350) in the Writtings of Demetrius Cydones", Byzantinos Domos 29 (2021), s. 417-439.

14th-century patriarchs of Constantinople
Athonite Fathers
Byzantine Thessalonians
Bishops of Monemvasia
1350 deaths